The Roman Catholic Diocese of Digos (Latin: Dioecesis Digosensis) is a diocese of the Catholic Church in the Philippines. Erected in 1979, the diocese was created from territory in the Archdiocese of Davao. The diocese has experienced no jurisdictional changes, and is currently a suffragan of the archdiocese.

The current bishop is Guillermo Dela Vega Afable, appointed in 2003. The 2 provinces of Davao del Sur and Davao Occidental are under the jurisdiction of this diocese.

Ordinaries

See also

Catholic Church in the Philippines

References 

Digos
Digos
Christian organizations established in 1979
Roman Catholic dioceses and prelatures established in the 20th century
Religion in Davao del Sur
Digos